The 1992 City of Aberdeen District Council election took place in April 1992 to elect members of City of Aberdeen Council, as part of that years Scottish local elections.

Election results

Ward results

References

1992
1992 Scottish local elections
20th century in Aberdeen